Józef Klotz (2 January 1900 – 1941) was a Polish footballer who played centre-half. He scored the first-ever goal for the Poland national football team. He was killed by the Nazis in the Warsaw Ghetto in 1941.

Biography
Klotz was born in Kraków, southern Poland, and was Jewish. His father was a shoemaker.

He scored the first-ever goal for the Poland national football team. He scored it against Sweden in Stockholm in May 1922, in the team's third international match.

Klotz played for two clubs. He played first for Jutrzenka Kraków, which he joined as a youth team player and played for from 1912 to 1925, and then for Maccabi Warszawa from 1925 to 1929  (both teams were Jewish minority teams). He retired as a player in 1930.

He was imprisoned in the Warsaw Ghetto in 1940. He was murdered there by the Germans in 1941.

In 2019, Klotz was honored by the Polish Football Association.

Statistics

Club career
 1910–1925  Jutrzenka Kraków
 1925–1929  Maccabi Warszawa

International
 14.5.1922 Kraków
Poland  0:3  Hungary

 28.5.1922 Stockholm
Sweden  1:2  Poland

See also
Polish soccer (football) in interwar period
List of select Jewish football (association; soccer) players

References

Sources
  Andrzej Gowarzewski "FUJI Football Encyclopedia – History of the Polish National Team (1) – White and Red" ; GiA Katowice 1991

1900 births
1941 deaths
Footballers from Kraków
People from the Kingdom of Galicia and Lodomeria
Austro-Hungarian Jews
Jewish Polish sportspeople
Polish footballers
Jewish footballers
Poland international footballers
Association football central defenders
Jutrzenka Kraków players
Male murder victims
People who died in the Warsaw Ghetto
Polish Jews who died in the Holocaust
Polish civilians killed in World War II